Wrapped is an alternative lifestyle magazine from Africa that caters to the entire LGBT community and is not gender-dominated.

History and profile
Wrapped was launched in 2004. Ladies And Ladders purchased the magazine early in 2006. Marie Gregory, owner and publisher originally form the UK, employed Albert Lotter, as Editor and with complete control over the magazine's direction and editorial drive.

During this period, Wrapped acquired a finalist position in the 2006 Nedbank Art's and Culture Trust Awards, for its contribution to culture in South Africa.

The magazine has been actively involved in various awareness projects, as well as charity campaigns. With the annual Sisters With Blisters walk (money donated for abused women and children) the magazine took part in walking three kilometres in high heels. Even sporty and muscular Albert "Al" Lotter participated in a pair of green-turquoise stiletto heels. When interviewed as to why he took part, he said "It's abusing yourself for women and kids who suffer, except this is self-inflicted. I will probably have blisters on my blisters after this."

The editor is a known activist and charity supporter, he has often donated money to worthy causes all over South Africa.

Wrapped is headquartered in Pretoria, with international distribution points.

The magazine title was bought over in May 2007.

Morne Ebersohn assumed the role of publisher from Edition 12 of the magazine.  Under his direction, the magazine has been repackaged to cater to the 25- to 35-year-old gay man living in metropolitan areas.  The magazine became the first South African Gay Lifestyle magazine to advertise on television, radio, cinema and the internet.

Wrapped became the first gay publication in South Africa to become Audit Bureau of Circulation (ABC) certified.

Advertising support for the magazine has increased since the magazine was repackaged to become a truly lifestyle magazine.

Wrapped TV was launched as a new brand in March 2008.  The Wrapped TV Channel which is run on the YouTube platform will give viewers a behind the scene view of what happens at Wrapped Magazine. During December 2008 a decision was made give Wrapped a cover to cover redesign. Edition 20 of Wrapped went on sale during the last week of April 2009 and the feedback on the magazine was overwhelming.  The new design focussed on a much cleaner and more relevant magazine for the Wrapped target audience.

References

External links
 Official website

2004 establishments in South Africa
LGBT-related magazines
LGBT culture in South Africa
Magazines established in 2004
Magazines published in South Africa
Mass media in Pretoria